Raymond Duchamp-Villon (5 November 1876 – 9 October 1918) was a French sculptor.

Life and art
Duchamp-Villon was born Pierre-Maurice-Raymond Duchamp in Damville, Eure, in the Normandy region of France, the second son of Eugène and Lucie Duchamp (née Nicolle), the daughter of painter and engraver Émile Frédéric Nicolle. Of the six Duchamp children, four would become successful artists. He was the brother of Jacques Villon (1875–1963), painter, printmaker; Marcel Duchamp (1887–1968), painter, sculptor and author; Suzanne Duchamp-Crotti (1889–1963), painter. Duchamp-Villon inherited his love for art from his mother.

From 1894 to 1898 Raymond Duchamp-Villon lived in the Montmartre Quarter of Paris with his brother Jacques and studied medicine at the Sorbonne. Rheumatic fever forced him to abandon his studies in 1898 and it left him partially incapacitated for a time. This unforeseen event altered the course of his life as he began to pursue an interest in sculpture. He started by creating small statuettes and essentially became self-taught, achieving a high level of mastery and acumen. In 1902 and 1903, he exhibited at the Salon de la Société Nationale des Beaux-Arts but to distinguish himself from his artist brother, he began to use the Duchamp-Villon designation on all his works.

In 1905 Duchamp-Villon had his first exhibition at the Salon d'Automne and a show at the Galerie Legrip in Rouen with his brother Jacques. Two years later they moved to the village of Puteaux at the outskirts of Paris where the three Duchamp brothers were part of the regular meetings of what became known as the Section d'Or, involving artists, poets and critics. Raymond's reputation was such that he was made a member of the jury of the sculpture section of the Salon d'Automne in 1907 and was later instrumental in promoting the Cubist movement.

In 1911 he exhibited at the Galerie de l’Art Contemporain in Paris and the following year his work was included in a show organized by the Duchamp brothers at the Salon de la Section d’Or at the Galerie de la Boétie. All three of the Duchamp brothers then showed their work at the 1913 Armory Show in New York City that helped introduce modern art to United States.

In 1913 he took part in exhibitions at the Galerie André Groult in Paris, the Galerie S. V. U. Mánes in Prague, and in 1914 at Der Sturm Gallery in Berlin. During World War I Raymond Duchamp-Villon served in the French army in a medical capacity, but still worked on his major cubist sculpture, The Large Horse.

In late 1916, Raymond Duchamp-Villon contracted typhoid fever while stationed at the military quarters in Champagne. As a result, he was taken to the military hospital at Cannes where he died.

In 1967, in Rouen, his last surviving artist brother Marcel helped organize an exhibition called Les Duchamp: Jacques Villon, Raymond Duchamp-Villon, Marcel Duchamp, Suzanne Duchamp. Some of this family exhibition was later shown at the Musée National d'Art Moderne in Paris.

Gallery

Publications 
 Tomkins, Calvin, Duchamp: A Biography. Henry Holt and Company, Inc., 1996.

See also 
 Cubism
 La Maison Cubiste

References 

 Tomkins, Calvin, Duchamp: A Biography. Henry Holt and Company, Inc., 1996.

External links 

Raymond Duchamp-Villon's Horse (video 3:49) Smarthistory

1876 births
1918 deaths
French military personnel killed in World War I
People from Eure
University of Paris alumni
Modern sculptors
Cubist artists
20th-century French sculptors
French male sculptors
Sibling artists